The men's long jump event at the 2019 European Athletics U23 Championships was held in Gävle, Sweden, at Gavlehov Stadium Park on 11 and 12 July.

Records
Prior to the competition, the records were as follows:

Results

Qualification

The qualification will be held on July 11 at 10:10.

Qualification rule: 7.75 (Q) or the 12 best results (q) qualified for the final.

Final

References

Long jump
Long jump at the European Athletics U23 Championships